Parliamentary elections were held in Djibouti on 21 May 1982. They were first elections for the National Assembly since independence in 1977, and were open only to the People's Rally for Progress, which had become the country's sole legal party the previous year. The RPP put forward a list of 65 candidates for the 65 seats, which was approved by 100% of voters with a turnout of 92.4%.

Results

References

Djibouti
Parliamentary election
Elections in Djibouti
One-party elections
Single-candidate elections
Djiboutian parliamentary election